General elections were held in the Northern Mariana Islands on November 4, 2014. Voters elected the Governor of the Northern Mariana Islands, the Lieutenant Governor, the Attorney General, the Delegate to the US Congress, the Senate, the House of Representatives, mayors, municipal councils and the Board of Education. Additionally, a referendum involving changes to the constitution was held.

Incumbent Republican Governor Eloy Inos was re-elected, facing two independent challengers and one Democratic challenger. The next lieutenant governor was elected on the same ticket, with incumbent Jude Hofschneider not running for re-election. As no candidate got a majority, a  runoff was held on November 21.

Background
The previous election was held in 2009 for a 5-year term, in order to move all elections to even years. Covenant Party candidate Benigno Repeki Fitial was re-elected; his running mate Eloy Inos was elected to his first full term as lieutenant governor. Fitial resigned as governor in February 2013 in the face of impeachment hearings. Inos thus became governor. In September 2013, he took steps to merge the Covenant Party with the territorial Republican Party, and ran for re-election as a Republican.

Gubernatorial election

Eloy Inos, the incumbent republican governor was re-elected. He was challenged by the speaker of the house and 2009 candidate, Heinz Sablan Hofschneider, former governor Juan Babauta (both running as independents), and democratic candidate Edward Masga Deleon Guerrero, former ports authority executive director.

Delegate to the US House of Representatives

Incumbent Delegate Gregorio Sablan was re-elected. He caucuses with the Democratic Party, but ran as an Independent. Sablan was challenged by democrat Andrew Salas, a former territorial representative and Commerce Secretary.

Northern Mariana Islands Commonwealth Legislature

Saipan Senate

House of Representative

Attorney General

Referendum
The general elections included three referendum questions, two of which involved legislative initiative amendments to the constitution. The constitutional amendments were to:
article XV, subsection 1(e) of the constitution to increase the minimum proportion of the Commonwealth general-revenue budget spent on primary and secondary education from 15% to 25%.  H.L.I. 18-12.
amend article XII, section 4 to redefine "persons of Northern Mariana Islands descent" as being someone who has "some degree of Northern Mariana Chamorro or Northern Mariana Carolinan blood", as opposed to the current requirement of at least 25% bloodline.  H.L.I. 18-1.

An amendment proposed by legislative initiative shall become effective if approved by a majority of the votes cast.  N.M.I. Const. art. XVIII, § 5(b).

The other referendum asked voters whether a Constitutional Convention should be convened to propose amendments to the constitution.  H.B. 18-5.

The Constitutional Convention proposal would have required two-thirds of the votes cast to be approved.   N.M.I. Const. art. XVIII, § 2(c).

Results

References

External links
Juan Babauta
Heinz Hofschneider
Gregorio Sablan
Andrew Salas

 
November 2014 events in Oceania
2014 in the Northern Mariana Islands
2014 elections in Oceania
2014 referendums
Referendums in the Northern Mariana Islands